Rivers of Turkey can be divided into several groups depending on where they flow.

Flow into the Black Sea

Europe

Mutludere  (also known as Rezovo) flows from Turkey into Bulgaria.  112 km 
Veleka flows into Bulgaria and then into the Black Sea.  147 km (25 km in Turkey)

Anatolia

Kızılırmak 'Red River' is the longest river in Turkey, also known as the Halys River.  1,350 km
Delice River - tributary
Devrez River - tributary
Gök River - tributary (also known as Gökırmak and in Classical times, Amnias)
Sakarya River is the third longest river in Turkey, also known as Sangarius.  824 km
Seydisuyu
Porsuk River
Ankara River
Harşit River in Gümüşhane and Giresun
Yeşilırmak  'Green River' (Classical Iris).  418 km
Çekerek River (Classical Scylax) is a tributary
Kelkit River (Classical Lycus (one of several))  is a tributary
Yağlıdere
Kılıçlar River
Tohumluk River
Üçköprü is not actually a river but the point where the Kılıçlar and Tohumluk meet
Aksu Deresi in Giresun Province
Batlama River in Giresun
Bartın River (Classical Parthenius)
Çoruh River (Classical Acampsis)
Gelevara Deresi
Kara Dere (Classical Hyssus or Hyssos)
Machakhlistskal(i)
Terme River (Classical Thermōdōn)
Filyos River (Classical Billaeus)

Flow into the Marmara Sea
Biga Çayı, the classical Granicus
Mustafakemalpaşa Çayı, the classical Rhyndacus
Simav Çayı or Susurluk Çayı, the classical Makestos

Flow into the Aegean Sea

Europe

Meriç (Maritsa or Evros) is in the European section of Turkey and has its source in Bulgaria.  It is 480 km long.
Tunca is a 350 km tributary in Bulgaria
Ergene is a tributary inside of Turkey.

Anatolia
Azmak Creek
Bakırçay (Classical Caicus or Astraeus)
Büyük Menderes River (Classical Maeander or Meander). 548 km
Lycus (river of Phrygia)
Cadmus (river)
Cayster River or Küçük Menderes.  114 km
Gediz River (Classical Hermus). 401 km
Pactolus (also known as Sart Çayı)
Karamenderes River (Classical Scamander)

Flow into the Mediterranean Sea

Aksu (Classical Kestros)
Manavgat River (Classical Melas)
Köprüçay River (Classical Eurymedon)
Dim River
Kaledran Creek
Dragon Creek (Turkey)
Sini Creek
Göksu (Classical Calycadnus)
Limonlu Çayı (also known as Lamas; Classical Lamos)
Alata River
Tömük Creek
Karacaoğlan River
Tece Creek
Mezitli River (Classical Liparis)
Efrenk River (also known as Müftü)
Deliçay
Berdan River (also called Tarsus; Classical Cydnus)
Seyhan River (Classical Sarus)
Zamantı River
Ceyhan River (Classical Pyramus or Leucosyrus). 509 km
Harman Çayı
Göksun Çayı 115 km
Payas River
Deli Çay River
Asi River (Classical Orontes)
Afrin River
Karasu

Flow into the Persian Gulf

Euphrates
Khabur River
Jaghjagh River
Sajur River
Karasu
Murat River
Tigris
Great Zab  (in Turkish Büyükzap Suyu)
Little Khabur
Botan River (Uluçay)
Batman River
Hezir River

Flow into the Caspian Sea

Kura River
Aras River
Arpaçay River  (also known as Akhurian) is a tributary of the Aras.  It arises in Armenia and forms part of the border between Armenia and Turkey before joining the Aras.

Ancient

Aegospotami
Asopus
Cales (river), modern Alaplı Su
Hyllus (river)
Lycus (river of Bithynia)
Lycus (river of Cilicia)
Lycus (river of Lydia)
River Meles
Pinarus River

Gallery

See also

Geography of Turkey
Regions of Turkey
Lakes of Turkey
Dams and reservoirs of Turkey

Turkey
Rivers